Choristoneura fractivittana, the broken-banded leafroller or dark-banded fireworm, is a moth of the family Tortricidae.

Distribution
This moth is native to North America, where it can be found across Canada and throughout the eastern United States.

Description
The wingspan is 16–28 mm. The forewings are orangish-yellow with an oblique brown median band broken by the ground color near the upper end. There is a narrow brown subapical patch at the costa, linked to the median band in the male, separated in the female. The hindwings are dark gray in the male and tan with a gray shade in the lower half in the female. The male is usually smaller and darker than the female.

Biology
The larva feeds on Malus, Fagus, Betula, Ulmus, Quercus and Rubus species.

There is one generation per year in the north and two in the south. The adult flies in May and June in the north and from May to August in the south.

Etymology
The species name is derived from Latin frangere  ("to break") and vitta ("a band" or "a stripe of color") and refers to the broken or separated brown band on the forewing.

External links
Bug Guide
mothphotographersgroup

Choristoneura